The Malaysian Anti-Corruption Commission Act 2009, is a Malaysian laws which enacted to provide for the establishment of the Malaysian Anti-Corruption Commission, to make further and better provisions for the prevention of corruption and for matters necessary thereto and connected therewith.

Structure
The Malaysian Anti-Corruption Commission Act 2009, in its current form (8 January 2009), consists of 9 Parts containing 74 sections and 1 schedule (including no amendment).
 Part I: Preliminary
 Part II: The Malaysian Anti-Corruption Commission
 Part III: Provisions on Advisory Board, Special Committee and Complaints Committee
 Part IV: Offences and Penalties
 Part V: Investigation, Search, Seizure and Arrest
 Part VI: Evidence
 Part VII: Prosecution and Trial of Offences
 Part VIII: General
 Part IX: Repeal and Saving
 Schedule

References

External links
 Malaysian Anti-Corruption Commission Act 2009 

2009 in Malaysian law
Malaysian federal legislation